Paulo Jorge Rodrigues Rocha (born 27 May 1977) is a Portuguese actor. He made his debut in Brazilian telenovelas in 2011 after starring in Fina Estampa.

Filmography

Awards and nominations

References

External links

1977 births
Living people
People from Setúbal
Portuguese male television actors
Portuguese emigrants to Brazil
Male actors from Rio de Janeiro (city)